Elizabeth Neuffer (June 15, 1956 – May 9, 2003) was an American journalist who specialized in covering war crimes, human rights abuses, and post-conflict societies. She died at the age of 46 in a car accident while covering the Iraq War.

Career
Neuffer began her career with The Boston Globe in the Washington bureau, where she covered Capitol Hill and the Clinton Administration’s plan for health care reform. She also reported from Moscow on the breakup of the Soviet Union, and from Saudi Arabia, Kuwait, and Iraq during the Gulf War.

She served as the European Bureau Chief from 1994 to 1998 in Berlin. During that time, she covered both the war in Bosnia and its subsequent peace, including the 1994 Sarajevo marketplace massacre, the fall of the UN “safe haven” Srebrenica, the arrival of American troops, and elections in postwar Bosnia. In addition to general coverage of the European continent – from the rise of the far-right in France to economic turmoil in Romania – she reported on civil unrest in Albania, violence in Kosovo, and was dispatched to Africa to report on the 1996 return of Hutu refugees  from Zaire to their native Rwanda.

The first reporter to reveal that indicted war criminals remained in power in post-war Bosnia, Neuffer dedicated almost a year to exclusively reporting about war crimes in Bosnia and Rwanda. That reporting earned her several awards, including the Johns Hopkins School of Advanced International Studies Award for Excellence in International Journalism. She was also awarded the Edward R. Murrow Fellowship at the Council on Foreign Relations in New York City, where she worked on a project about war crimes while on leave from The Boston Globe.

In 1998 Neuffer won a Courage in Journalism Award from the International Women's Media Foundation (IWMF).

She was the author of The Key to My Neighbor’s House: Seeking Justice in Bosnia and Rwanda, published by Picador in 2001.

Death

On May 9, 2003, she was killed in a car accident in Iraq while on assignment there covering the aftermath of the war.

References

External links 
  on Amazon.com
 IWMF Elizabeth Neuffer Fellowship

1956 births
2003 deaths
American women war correspondents
Cornell University alumni
The Boston Globe people
American women journalists
Road incident deaths in Iraq
People from Wilton, Connecticut
20th-century American women
20th-century American people
21st-century American women